(3 February 1943 – 1 January 2021) was a Japanese actor.

Biography
He started acting at age 15 in Kyoto, the capital of Japanese cinema. A specialist in film and television jidaigeki set in the Edo period, he most often played a rōnin, but in his hundreds of appearances he took nearly every role. His forte was kirareyaku, the person who loses the sword fight. In addition, he appeared in modern dramas in roles such as police and yakuza. The American film The Last Samurai brought him before an international audience in the role of the Silent Samurai.

Fukumoto played a lead role for the first time in the film Uzumasa Limelight.

Death
Fukumoto died on 1 January 2021, at his home in Kyoto, due to lung cancer. He was 77 years old.

Filmography

Film
 Ninpō-chushingura (1965)
 Battles Without Honor and Humanity (1973)
 Battles Without Honor and Humanity: Deadly Fight in Hiroshima (1973)
 Battles Without Honor and Humanity: Proxy War (1973)
 Battles Without Honor and Humanity: Police Tactics (1974)
 Gambling Den Heist (1975)
 New Battles Without Honor and Humanity: The Boss's Head (1975)
 New Battles Without Honor and Humanity: The Boss's Last Days (1976)
 The Fall of Ako Castle (1978)
 Nihon no Fixer (1979)
 Sanada Yukimura no Bōryaku (1979)
 Roaring Fire (1982) - Ikeda Hinoharu
 Ninja Wars (1982)
 Shogun's Shadow (1989)
 New Battles Without Honor and Humanity (2000)
 The Last Samurai (2003)
 Chō Ninja Tai Inazuma! (2006) - Rōnin
 Engine Sentai Go-onger: Boom Boom! Bang Bang! GekijōBang!! (2008) - Samurai
 OOO, Den-O, All Riders: Let's Go Kamen Riders (2011) - General Black
 Uzumasa Limelight (2014, Leading actor) - Seiichi
 108: Revenge and Adventure of Goro Kaiba (2019)
 BLACKFOX: Age of the Ninja (2019)

Television
 The Yagyu Conspiracy (1978) - Kitano
 Juuken Sentai Gekiranger (33) - Head Samurai
 Seibu Keisatsu
 The Unfettered Shogun V - Episode 26

Awards
 Japan Academy Prize Special Award from the Association (2004)
 Fantasia International Film Festival Best Actor Award (2014)

References

External links

Actor Makes a Living Getting Killed by Samurai

1943 births
2021 deaths
Japanese male film actors
Actors from Hyōgo Prefecture
20th-century Japanese male actors
21st-century Japanese male actors
Japanese male television actors
Deaths from lung cancer in Japan